An editio typica (Latin) or typical edition is a form of text used in the Catholic Church as an official source text of a particular document—typically in Eccelesiastical Latin—and used as the basis for all subsequent translations into vernacular languages.

Catholic Church organisation